The Archdiocese of Athens ( or Athenarum) is a Latin Church ecclesiastical territory or archdiocese of the Catholic Church in Greece. Its cathedra is found within the neoclassic Cathedral Basilica of St. Dionysius the Areopagite, in the episcopal see of Athens.

History
The See of Athens is one of the oldest Christian bishoprics, dating back to Hierotheos the Thesmothete in the mid-1st century AD. In ca. 800, it was raised to a metropolitan see.

In 1205, the city was captured by the Crusaders, who had conquered Constantinople and dissolved the Byzantine Empire the year before. The city's incumbent Greek Orthodox bishop, Michael Choniates, retired to the island of Kea, and a Latin Catholic archbishop was installed in his place, with the French cleric Berard being elected to the post in 1206.

The Crusaders largely maintained the ecclesiastical order they found, appointing Catholic bishops to replace the Orthodox prelates. Thus, in a letter by Pope Innocent III to Berard in 1209, 11 suffragan sees are mentioned under Athens, identical to those under Byzantine rule, although most of them were de facto vacant: Negroponte (Egripontis), Thermopylae (Cermopilensis, seat in Bodonitsa),  Davleia (Davaliensem),  Aulon (Abelonensem), Oreoi (Zorconensis), Karystos (Caristiensem), Koroneia (Coroniacensem), Andros (Andrensem), Megara (Megarensem), Skyros (Squirensem), and Kea (Cheensem). In the Provinciale Romanum, a list of the sees subordinate to the See of Rome, dating to some time before 1228, the number of suffragans is reduced to eight: Thermopylae, Daulia, Salona, Negroponte, Aulon, Oreoi, Megara, and Skyros.

The Catholic see remained vacant for a period after the Catalan Company conquered the Duchy of Athens in 1311 due to the Catalans' conflict with the papacy, and a residential archbishop is not attested until around the mid-14th century. Beginning with Dorotheus I ca. 1388, the Orthodox bishops of Athens, who had been continued to be appointed as titular holders since the Latin conquest, were allowed to resume residence in the city, but the Latin Archbishop retained his pre-eminent position until the conquest of the Duchy of Athens by the Ottoman Empire in 1456. The last Latin Archbishop, Nicholas Protimo, fled to Venetian-held Euboea, where he died in 1482. The Catholic see was held by titular archbishops thereafter.

On 23 July 1875, the see was restored as the modern Catholic Archdiocese of Athens, ministering to the Catholic inhabitants of the Greek capital and most of mainland Greece.

List of Archbishops of Athens

Medieval metropolitan archbishops

Titular archbishops

Modern metropolitan archbishops

See also
Roman Catholicism in Greece
List of Roman Catholic dioceses in Greece

Notes

References

 
 
 
 
 
 
 
 

Roman Catholic dioceses in Greece
Roman Catholic dioceses established in the 13th century
Christianity in Athens